Emma Konrad (born 21 November 1929) is a Romanian sprinter. She competed in the women's 100 metres at the 1952 Summer Olympics.

References

External links
 

1929 births
Living people
Athletes (track and field) at the 1952 Summer Olympics
Romanian female sprinters
Olympic athletes of Romania
Place of birth missing (living people)
Olympic female sprinters